Brusse  is a surname. Notable people with the surname include:

  (born 1951), South African botanist and lichenologist
  (1921–1996), Dutch journalist
 Kees Brusse (1925–2013), Dutch actor, film director, and screenwriter